Per Arne Rikvold (born 4 October 1948 in Norway) is an academic physicist specializing in materials science, condensed-matter physics and computational science.

He took the cand.real. degree at the University of Oslo in 1976 and the PhD at Temple University in 1983. He is James G. Skofronick Professor of Physics at Florida State University, where is affiliated with the Center for Materials Research and Technology (MARTECH), the  School of Computational Science, and the National High Magnetic Field Laboratory.

He is an elected fellow of the Norwegian Academy of Science and Letters and of the American Physical Society.

References

1948 births
Living people
Norwegian physicists
Norwegian materials scientists
Norwegian emigrants to the United States
University of Oslo alumni
Temple University alumni
Florida State University faculty
Members of the Norwegian Academy of Science and Letters
Fellows of the American Physical Society
Computational physicists